Moolakadai, which is pronounced as 'Moolakkadai', is a part of North Chennai, Tamil Nadu, India. It is the gateway of North Chennai.

Moolakadai Junction is the place where G.N.T. Road (NH 5: Chennai-Kolkata Highway) and Madhavaram High Road (Perambur - Madhavaram road) intersect. 
Moolakadai is primarily a high traffic area in North Chennai due to the movement of Heavy vehicles (mainly containers) as most of those heavy vehicles have to pass through Moolakadai , to and fro the Chennai Port.

For those who come from other areas of Chennai, Moolakadai acts as the gateway to the areas like Madhavaram, Kodungaiyur, Madhavaram Milk Colony, Mathur MMDA, and Manali.

Location
North Chennai .

Transportation
Metropolitan Transport Corporation (MTC) takes care of the bus services to Moolakadai. 
Moolakadai is an important stage for MTC. Moolakadai is reasonably well connected to almost all the parts of North Chennai.
Though Moolakadai does not have a Bus terminus, good number of MTC buses pass through the Moolakadai Junction. Some of the buses are : 

Night Service Availability: 121A, 121G, 170A.

Banks

Given below are the Banks /ATMs located in Moolakadai:
 Indian Overseas Bank with ATM (Near Murari Hospital)
 Union Bank of India, Moolakadai with ATM
 Central Bank of India, Moolakadai with ATM, Next to Sembium EB, Moolakadai

ATMs-
 ICICI Bank ATM, Opp to Sembium EB, Moolakadai
 AXIS Bank ATM, Moolakadai
 IOB ATM near Ravi Garden

Hospitals

 K.V.T. Health Centre
 NRV Hospital

Chennai Metro Rail
A project study would be taken up to establish links between Moolakadai—Thirumangalam, Moolakadai—Thiruvanmiyur and Luz—Poonamallee through Iyyappanthangal..
The Proposed Routes are:
Moolakadai — Perambur — Kilpauk — Thousand Lights — Mylapore — Thiruvanmiyur Line 3 [19 km]
Moolakadai — Redhills — Ambattur — Mogappair — Thirumangalam Line 4 [22 km]

Neighbourhoods in Chennai